Sufi Sheykh (also Romanized as Şūfī Sheykh; also known as Sāzemān-e Sarlashgar Anşārī and Şūfī Sheykh-e ‘Aţālar) is a village in Tamran Rural District, in the Central District of Kalaleh County, Golestan Province, Iran. At the 2006 census, its population was 152, in 28 families.

References 

Populated places in Kalaleh County